Kinetics Internet Protocol (KIP) is a network protocol used for the encapsulation and routing of AppleTalk data packets over IP. It also controls the routing tables. 

It is defined in RFC 1742.

Apple Computer adopted the usage of KIP and refer to it as part of MacIP.

Literature 
 Sidhu, Andrews, Oppenheimer: Inside AppleTalk, 2nd, Addison-Wesley, 1999
 Apple Computer Inc.: Inside Macintosh: Networking, 2nd, Addison-Wesley, 1994, Chapter 1 - Introduction to AppleTalk (online version)

Network protocols